Dusit is a khwaeng (subdistrict) of Dusit District, in Bangkok, Thailand.

Naming
Its named after Dusit Palace, that is located in the area.

The word "Dusit", refers to "Tushita", the fourth of six heavenly realm, according to the belief in Buddhist cosmology.  The residence of Bodhisattva Svetaketu who believed to have advented as a Buddha on the human world.

Geography
Dusit has a total area of 2.233 km2 (about 0.862 mi2), which is the most southern part of the district, and most of the area is the royal court and government offices. It is the site of Dusit District Office.

The area is bordered by neighbouring subdistricts (from the north clockwise): Thanon Nakhon Chai Si in its district (Khlong Samsen is a borderline), Suan Chitlada in its district (Khlong Prem Prachakon is a borderline), Wat Sommanat of Pom Prap Sattru Phai District and Bang Khun Phrom of Phra Nakhon District (Khlong Phadung Krung Kasem is a borderline), Wachiraphayaban in its district (Samsen Road is a borderline).

Demography
In 2017 it had a total population of 12,792 people.

References

Subdistricts of Bangkok
Dusit district